Momal Rano or Mumal Rano  is a romantic tale of Momal and Rano from the Sindhi folklore and Rajasthani folklore. It is a multifaceted story that entails adventure, magic, schemes, beauty, love, ordeals of separation and above all romantic tragedy.

The fame of the story is ascribed to Ganj or Shah Jo Risalo; the poetry book Shah Abdul Latif Bhittai wrote, which also included other stories like Umar Marui, Sohni Mehar, Sassui Punhun, Noori Jam Tamachi, Sorath Rai Diyach and Lilan Chanesar. The protagonists of these seven tales are women; hence, including Momal, all have remained cultural icons in Sindhi Literature and known as the Seven Heroines of Shah Abdul Latif Bhittai. Earlier, apart from Shah Abdul Latif Bhittai, several other poets, like Shah Inat Rizvi, for instance, wrote verses on this tale and many others after Latif's demise, like Tajal Bewas and Shaikh Ayaz (to quote a few) tried upon the same tale; hence all broadened the perspective of the tale from different angles. Nonetheless, Momal-Rano is considered to be one of the most popular folktales in Sindhi and Rajasthani literature.

The story also appears in Shah Jo Risalo and forms part of seven popular tragic romances from Sindh, Pakistan. The other six tales are Umar Marvi, Sassui Punnhun, Sohni Mehar, Lilan Chanesar, Noori Jam Tamachi and Sorath Rai Diyach commonly known as the Seven Queens of Sindh, or the Seven heroines of Shah Abdul Latif Bhittai.

Historical context
The story is considered to have occurred in the geographical belts of Rajasthan, India as well as Sindh, Pakistan. The belt that covers the geography of Rajasthan in relation to the story is Lodrawa or Lodhruva in Jaisalmer district; while the area in Sindh is Momal Ji Maari (Momal's Mansion) and her father's house in Ghotki district of the province. The story occurred in the times of Hameer Soomro, the King of Umerkot or Amarkot (now a district in the south-east of Sindh province in Pakistan), possibly in the mid-14th century.

Story
The king of Amarkot, Hameer Soomoro, along with his ministers, Rano Mahendhra, Seenharro Dhamachanni and Daunro Bhatyanni, used to go for hunting in the far flung areas of Amarkot and sometimes could even cross the boundaries of their little country for the adventure. Once during a hunting spree, these four men were encountered by a person who came across them accidentally.

They did not disclose to the fellow who they were and what they did. But the fellow engaged them in the story of what happened to him in the preceding days. He was a prince from the area near Kashmir, who had heard the legend of Momal's beauty and charm and got so inspired that he pursued the adventure, but when he approached the area where Momal lived, he was not only overpowered by her enchanting beauty but also the tricks and schemes played by her female servants/sisters, who not only robbed that prince of his wealth and material but also so confused him in multiple puzzles that he could do nothing else but save his life and run.

The story told by this prince was sufficient to intrigue those four friends. They extracted information from the prince about Momal's whereabouts and decided to pursue the same adventure.

The place where Momal lived was near Lodhruva, in the north-east of Umerkot. She lived with her seven (some historians say nine) sisters, the most famous of which being Somal and Natir, (some consider her to be Momal's servant rather than sister) in a palace called Kak Mahal (The Palace of Kak). It was a magical palace with labyrinths, puzzles, fake ponds, illusions and much more. It was a legend that anyone who wanted to be a suitor for Momal would undergo several obstacles, and the one who succeeded in reaching the palace unharmed would possibly be accepted as her consort. As the history suggested, almost everyone who approached Momal and her sisters/servants was robbed of everything including their lives excluding a few like the prince from Kashmir who told the stories of his devastation.

Momal enjoyed legendary beauty. Somal was famous for intelligence; while Natir was known as a schemer. They worked collectively to enchant the suitors and overpower them. They could not let the suitors experience an easy task of puzzles they designed for them. As the luck would have it, Rano Mendhro, who was famously intelligent and brave, was the only person to successfully reach the palace, utterly unharmed. Momal was fairly impressed and that led him to be accepted as her consort. The King Hameer, along with other two ministers, left Rano Mendhro at Kak and left for Umerkot.

Rano and Momal kept meeting each other for long and their love story gained profundity of feelings from both sides. However, King Hameer felt jealous about Rano to have succeeded in overpowering the most beautiful woman in the world he personally knew. So he kept a check on Rano and asked him not to meet Momal. Rano being his minister had to abide by the orders of his King friend. But his passion about Momal did not let him stay peacefully away from her. So usually he left for Ludhruva on his camel in the evening after work and returned to Umerkot by the next morning. Whenever he did that, which he did pretty often, he tried to stealthily go and meet Momal, it was pretty long distance though. Somehow he was caught one day and the king imprisoned him. But for the old friendship sake the king released him with conditions not to meet Momal again. But this had not to happen. He continued the same pursuit.

Once Rano was unable to reach Kak, so Momal, out of passion and extreme wait for her beloved, asked her sister Somal to wear clothes like the ones Rano used to wear and slept by her side. The moment Rano arrived, he mistook Somal as Momal's lover and, in utter disgust, left the palace for Umerkot leaving behind his cane. As Momal woke up, she saw his cane and realized Rano had been to her room and seen her with Somal, rather mistaken Somal to be some man, and perhaps gone for good. This was too much for her. Momal waited for his return but to no avail. At last, when the push comes to shove, she resorted to go out for Rano in Umerkot. Disguised as a man, she finally searched him and stayed in Umerkot for some time. In a short span of time, Rano came to learn it was Momal, who had disguised herself. So he tried to go away from her. Then she pleaded him to forgive her for her mistake, which was basically not an intentional trick but an outburst of passionate feelings about Rano, and nothing else. Rano was too obstinate to forgive her. Out of desperation, she jumped in raging fire. When Rano came to learn this, he followed her in the same flames and got consumed by the same.

Historicity
The story of Momal-Rano is a combination of both fact and fiction. The names of places related to the tale are real, both within the boundaries of the province of Sindh and Rajasthan. However, the ideas of magic, Kak, concerns as to how Rano was able to travel so fast from Umerkot to Lodhruva almost every day etc. make it a legend. The story of Momal Rano has also been compared with the legend of Orpheus. In the Greek myth, Sirens, beautiful yet dangerous creatures, lured nearby sailors with their enchanting voices/music and led their ships to wreck on the rocky coast of their island, Anthemoessa, looted and destroyed the seafarers. Identically Momal and her servants/sister did the same at Kak Mahal. Orpheus was the one to overpower their music with his lyre and saved his ship. Rano overpowered the magical world of Momal and her company.

Metaphorical significance
The love of Momal and Rano is an allegorical metaphor for the love of the soul and divine. The separation and longing between two lovers parallels the separation of the Divine and the human soul and longing of both the divine and the human soul to merge and dissolve into each other much like Momal and Rano were unified in the burning fire. The human soul, ruh, longs for Allah and in absolute overpowering self abnegating devotion cares nothing for the world or society and seeks union with divinity in the crazed love experienced by Sufis.

Popular culture
The Momal Rano love story continues to inspire numerous modern songs, including Dastaan-e-Moomal by The Sketches from Coke Studio Pakistan (season 11) Episode 5.

References

External links
 Moomal Rano
Mumal Rano in Sindhi
Sur Mumal Rano in Risalo 
Mumal and Rano: by Elsa Kazi
Dastaan-e-Moomal Rano by Coke Studio Season 11

Love stories
Sindhi folklore
Pakistani literature
Pakistani folklore
Sindhi people
Literary duos
Sufism in Sindh
Shah Jo Risalo